Synaphe bombycalis is a species of moth of the family Pyralidae described by Michael Denis  and Ignaz Schiffermüller in 1775. It is found in Spain, France, Austria, Italy, the Czech Republic, Slovakia, Hungary, Romania, Ukraine, Russia, Morocco, Turkey, Turkmenistan and Kazakhstan.

References

Moths described in 1775
Pyralini
Moths of Europe
Moths of Asia